Jeferson de Araújo de Carvalho (born 22 June 1996), known as Jeferson Carvalho, or only Jeferson, is a Brazilian footballer who plays as a right back for São Bernardo.

Career

Ponte Preta
Born in Campinas, Jeferson graduated with Ponte Preta's youth setup. On 7 September 2011 he made his first team debut, coming on as a second-half substitute in a 0–1 away loss against Nacional for Copa do Brasil.

Jeferson made his Série A debut on 15 October 2015, starting in a 1–0 away success over Palmeiras. His first goal in the category came on 16 June 2016, in a 3–2 home success over Atlético Paranaense.

In April 2019, he joined Vila Nova on loan.

International career
Jeferson was called up for Brazil under-17s ahead of the South American championship and World Cup.

Jogou a copa do mundo sub 17 em 2013, sendo eliminado nas quartas de finais.

Career statistics

References

External links

1996 births
Living people
Sportspeople from Campinas
Brazilian footballers
Association football defenders
Campeonato Brasileiro Série A players
Campeonato Brasileiro Série B players
Campeonato Brasileiro Série C players
Campeonato Brasileiro Série D players
Associação Atlética Ponte Preta players
Esporte Clube Vitória players
Vila Nova Futebol Clube players
Botafogo Futebol Clube (SP) players
Ituano FC players
Mirassol Futebol Clube players
Clube Náutico Capibaribe players
Esporte Clube Santo André players
Associação Ferroviária de Esportes players
Londrina Esporte Clube players
São Bernardo Futebol Clube players